Neocoenyra bioculata is a butterfly in the family Nymphalidae. It is found in Malawi.

Subspecies
Neocoenyra bioculata bioculata (Malawi: Tsenga Mountains)
Neocoenyra bioculata murphyi Collins, 1997 (Malawi: Dzelanyama, Kasitu Rock)

References

Satyrini
Butterflies described in 1964
Endemic fauna of Malawi
Butterflies of Africa